We All Fall Down may refer to:

Literature 
 We All Fall Down (Brian Caldwell novel)
 We All Fall Down (Robert Cormier novel)
 We All Fall Down (Eric Walters novel)
 We All Fall Down (Daniel Kalla novel)
 "We all fall down", a line from the nursery rhyme "Ring a Ring o' Roses"

Film 
 We All Fall Down (1997 film), a 1997 Italian film starring Anita Caprioli
 We All Fall Down (2000 film), a 2000 Canadian film starring Helen Shaver
 We All Fall Down, a 2005 film starring Carly Schroeder
 We All Fall Down, a 2005 film starring Tara Killian
 We All Fall Down: The American Mortgage Crisis, a 2009 film produced by Flavio Alves

Television 
 "We All Fall Down" (Fear the Walking Dead)
 "We All Fall Down", an episode of The Brittas Empire
 "We All Fall Down", an episode of Da Vinci's Inquest
 "We All Fall Down", an episode of Warehouse 13

Music 
 We All Fall Down (album), a 2013 album by Prozak
 We All Fall Down, an album by The Congress, featuring John Darnielle

Songs 
 “We All Fall Down”, by A-Trak
 "We All Fall Down", by Aerosmith from Music From Another Dimension
 "We All Fall Down", by Bekka Bramlett, from the soundtrack of the film America's Sweethearts
 "We All Fall Down", by Blue Murder from Nothin' but Trouble
 "We All Fall Down", by Cavo from Bright Nights Dark Days
 "We All Fall Down", by Clint Black from Spend My Time
 "We All Fall Down", by D. C. Simpson from Shiver
 "We All Fall Down", by Diamond Rio from Completely
 "We All Fall Down", by Egg Hunt
 "We All Fall Down", by The Explosion from Black Tape
 "We All Fall Down", by Farewell from Run It Up the Flagpole
 "We All Fall Down", by I Like Trains from Elegies to Lessons Learnt
 "We All Fall Down", by John Miles from More Miles Per Hour
 "We All Fall Down", by Kate Alexa from Broken & Beautiful
 "We All Fall Down", by Ph.D. from Three
 "We All Fall Down", by Take That from Beautiful World

See also 
 "Goodbye, My Coney Island Baby", a song whose middle section is known as "We All Fall"
 All Fall Down (disambiguation)